Hays International College is a tertiary level training institute situated in Melbourne, Australia.

The college offers certificate and diploma courses in Leisure and Health, Individual Support and Aged Care.

Many of its students take up their chosen vocational course. Subsequent completion of a diploma course provides graduates with entry to degree courses offered at universities. The course chosen by a student may also give access to Australia's migration programs.

References 

Education in Melbourne